The SteamRanger Heritage Railway is a  long  broad gauge tourist railway, formerly the Victor Harbor railway line of the South Australian Railways (SAR). It is operated by the not-for-profit South Australian Division of the Australian Railway Historical Society. As the last operating non-suburban line of the former broad-gauge network, on which Australia's first public railway was opened, the line and its associated rail assets have high historical significance.

History
In the 1970s, the South Australian Division of the Australian Railway Historical Society established SteamRanger as a not-for-profit railway preservation offshoot to operate its train tours from Adelaide, mainly on rural lines throughout the state's broad-gauge networks. From the mid-1980s, SteamRanger gradually took over the operation and maintenance of the Victor Harbor railway line in the Adelaide Hills.

When plans were announced for the Adelaide to Melbourne line to be converted to  standard gauge, SteamRanger had to choose between staying at Dry Creek and losing its investment in the Victor Harbor line, or move and become isolated from Adelaide's suburban railway lines.Since the first choice would break the society's financial viability, in a huge project all of SteamRanger's locomotives and rolling stock were moved. A new depot was built at Mount Barker railway station, at the northern end of the broad-gauge line to Victor Harbor. As part of the move, the District Council of Mount Barker renovated the station building, derelict at the time, to become SteamRanger's headquarters. Conversion of the interstate line was completed in 1995 as part of the One Nation infrastructure upgrade program. Following closure of South Australia's remaining broad-gauge tracks, the line has become the last operating memory of locomotive-hauled trains on the broad gauge.

Services
, scheduled SteamRanger trips were as follows.

Fleet

See also
Rail transport in South Australia
Railways in Adelaide
Victor Harbor railway line

References

http://www.steamrangerheritagerailway.org/events/

http://www.steamrangerheritagerailway.org/volunteering-with-steamranger/520-restoration-appeal/

External links
SteamRanger Heritage Railway website
SteamRanger Heritage Railway enthusiasts

Fleurieu Peninsula
Heritage railways in Australia
Museums in South Australia
Railway museums in South Australia